Paul Charles Aars (June 4, 1934 in CuraçaoJanuary 23, 2002 in San Mateo, California) was an American stock car driver. He was born on June 4, 1934, and lived in San Mateo, California.

Aars made one start in the premier division of NASCAR, which was then known as the Grand National Series. On June 1, 1958, he was among the 46 drivers to race in the Crown American 500 at Riverside International Raceway in Riverside, California.

He started the 500-mile race in 45th place in a '56 Ford. He finished in 10th place, although he was 32 laps behind the winner of the 190 lap race. The race was won by Eddie Gray who earned $3,225 in winnings. Aars himself only received $200. He finished 67th in points that year. He died from natural causes when he was 67 years old.  He was survived by his wife Anita Aars.

Motorsports career results

NASCAR 
(key) (Bold – Pole position awarded by qualifying time. Italics – Pole position earned by points standings or practice time. * – Most laps led.)

Grand National Series

References

External links
 

1934 births
2002 deaths
Curaçao sportspeople
NASCAR drivers
People from San Mateo, California
Racing drivers from California
Sportspeople from the San Francisco Bay Area